Guler was one of the 68 assembly constituencies of Himachal Pradesh a northern Indian state. Guler was part of Kangra Lok Sabha constituency. Later, parts of it merged into Jawali.

Members of the Legislative Assembly
 1967: Churamani, Independent
 1977: Harbans Singh Rana, Janata Party
 1982: Chander Kumar, Indian National Congress
 1985: Chander Kumar, Indian National Congress
 1990: Harbans Singh Rana, Bharatiya Janata Party
 1993: Chander Kumar, Indian National Congress
 1998: Chander Kumar, Indian National Congress
 2003: Chander Kumar, Indian National Congress
 2004: (By Polls): Harbans Singh Rana, Bharatiya Janata Party
 2007: Neeraj Bharti, Indian National Congress

Election results

2007

See also
 Haripur Guler
 Kangra district
 Kangra (Lok Sabha constituency)

References

Kangra district
Former assembly constituencies of Himachal Pradesh